Abersoch Golf Club (Welsh: Clwb Golff Abersoch) is a golf club based just outside Abersoch at Gwynedd, Wales. This 18-hole course has a mixture of both links and parkland. The club was founded on Boxing Day 1907 and designed by Harry Vardon.

References

External links

Golf clubs and courses in Wales
Golf club
1907 establishments in Wales
Golf clubs and courses designed by Harry Vardon
Sports venues completed in 1907